In rugby union, the Triple Crown is an honour contested annually by the "Home Nations" – i.e. Ireland, England, Scotland, and Wales who compete within the larger Six Nations Championship. If any one of these teams defeat all three other teams, they win the Triple Crown.

The Six Nations Championship also includes France and Italy, but their involvement in the tournament has no influence on the result of the Triple Crown, although it means that the winners of the Triple Crown are not necessarily the winners of the Championship as a whole.

England won the first Triple Crown – although the phrase was not in use at the time – in the inaugural 1883 series of the original rugby union Home Nations Championship. The latest winners of the Triple Crown are Ireland, who won it by beating England at the Aviva Stadium in the 2023 Six Nations Championship.

Traditionally the Triple Crown was an informal honour with no trophy associated with it. However a trophy now exists, which has been awarded to Triple Crown winners since 2006.

Name

The origins of the name Triple Crown are uncertain.  The concept dates to the original Home Nations Championship, predecessor of the Six Nations Championship, when the competition only involved England, Ireland, Scotland and Wales.  Like the modern Grand Slam, the Triple Crown was an informal honour to a team that won the Championship with straight victories.

The first use cited in the Oxford English Dictionary is from Whitaker's Almanack, 1900 (referring to the 1899 tournament): "In their last match at Cardiff against Wales, Ireland won by a try to nothing, securing the triple crown with three straight victories as in 1894." The Irish victory in 1894 was reported as a Triple Crown by The Irish Times at the time and is possibly the first time the phrase was seen in print.

The phrase Triple Crown is also used in a number of other sports.

Trophy history
Until 2006, no actual trophy was awarded to the winner of the Triple Crown, hence it was sometimes referred to as the "invisible cup". Dave Merrington, a retired miner from South Hetton, County Durham, fashioned an aspiring trophy in 1975 from a lump of coal hewn from the Haig Colliery in Cumbria. This has a crown sitting on a four-sided base on which are represented a rose, a shamrock, a thistle and the Prince of Wales feathers. It is kept in the Museum of Rugby at Twickenham.

For the 2006 Six Nations, Barry Hooper, Head of External Communications at the Royal Bank of Scotland (the primary sponsor of the competition) commissioned Edinburgh and London based Hamilton & Inches to design and create a dedicated Triple Crown Trophy. This has been awarded to Triple Crown winning sides since 2006. It has been won six times by Ireland, four times by Wales and three times by England.

Winners

There has been a Triple Crown winner in 69 of the 125 competitions held from 1883 through to 2021 (twelve years of competition were not played due to the two World Wars). The 2017 campaign was the most recent edition when no Triple Crown was claimed.

Wales and England have both retained the Triple Crown for four consecutive years: Wales (1976–1979) and England (1995–1998). Scotland and Ireland have never won the Triple Crown for more than two successive championships.

It is possible for the Triple Crown winners to not also win that year's tournament. France and Italy may win either the tournament or Grand Slam while a home nation completes the Triple Crown and on rare occasions, it is possible for one home nation to win the Triple Crown, while another claims the championship title (but not the Grand Slam). To date, the Triple Crown winners who failed to win the Championship are Wales in 1977, England in 1997, 1998, 2002 and 2014, and Ireland in 2004, 2006, 2007 and 2022. The champions were France on each occasion, apart from 2014 when Ireland were Six Nations champions despite losing to Triple Crown winners England, the first instance of a team winning the Triple Crown but losing the overall title to another team eligible for it.

Triple Crown winners who succeeded only in sharing the Championship were England in 1954 (lost to France, shared the title with France and Wales) and 1960 (drew with France and shared the title with them), and Wales in 1988 (lost to France and shared the title with them).

The following table shows the number of Triple Crown wins by each country, and the years in which they were achieved.

The following table shows Triple Crown winners chronologically.

See also
 England national rugby union team
 Grand Slam
 Ireland national rugby union team
 Pacific Tri-Nations
 Rugby union trophies and awards
 Scotland national rugby union team
 Six Nations Championship
 Six Nations Wooden Spoon
 Tri Nations
 Wales national rugby union team

Notes and references

External links

"Triple Crown becomes tangiable (sic)", RugbyRugby.com, 25 January 2006
Official Six Nations Site
Link to image of Triple Crown Trophy 
Hamilton & Inches silver craftsmen create a Triple Crown Trophy

Six Nations Championship trophies